The following bibliography of the American Civil War comprises over 60,000 books on the war, with more appearing each month. There is no complete bibliography to the war; the largest guide to books is over 40 years old and lists over 6,000 titles selected by leading scholars. The largest guides to the historiography annotates over a thousand titles.

Note: This article forms part of Bibliography of the American Civil War.

States, regions, and local
 Colton, Ray Charles. The Civil War in the Western Territories: Arizona, Colorado, New Mexico, and Utah. University of Oklahoma Press, 1959.
 Crofts, Daniel W. Reluctant Confederates: Upper South Unionists in the Secession Crisis. 1989.
 Fiske, John. The Mississippi Valley in the Civil War. 1900.
 Harris, William C. Lincoln and the Border States: Preserving the Union. Lawrence, Kansas: University Press of Kansas, 2011.
 Josephy, Alvin M. The Civil War in the American West. New York: Alfred A. Knopf, 1993.
 Kerby, Robert L. Kirby Smith's Confederacy: The Trans-Mississippi South, 1863-1865. Columbia University Press, 1972.
 Monaghan, Jay. Civil War on the Western Border, 1854-1865. 1955.
 Noe, Kenneth W. and Shannon H. Wilson. The Civil War in Appalachia: Collected Essays. Knoxville, Tennessee: University of Tennessee Press, 1997.
 Pittman, Walter Earl. Rebels in the Rockies: Confederate Irregulars in the Western Territories. McFarland & Company, 2014. .

Alabama
 Bergeron, Jr., Arthur W. Confederate Mobile. Baton Rouge, Louisiana: Louisiana State University Press, 2000. .
 Barney, William L. The Secessionist Impulse: Alabama and Mississippi in 1860. Princeton, New Jersey: Princeton University Press, 1974.
 Danielson, Joseph W. War's Desolating Scourge: The Union Occupation of North Alabama. University Press of Kansas, 2012. .
 Delaney, Caldwell. Confederate Mobile: A Pictorial History. Mobile, Alabama: Haunted Book Shop, 1971.
 Denman, Clarence P. The Secession Movement in Alabama. Montgomery, Alabama: Alabama State Department of Archives and History, 1933.
 Dodd, Don. The Civil War in Winston County, Alabama, "the free state" . Northwest Alabama Pub. Co., 1979.
 Fitzgerald, W. Norma. President Lincoln's Blockade and the Defense of Mobile. Lincoln Fellowship of Wisconsin,  1954.
 Fleming, Walter L. Civil War and Reconstruction in Alabama. New York: Columbia University Press, 1905. the most detailed study; Dunning School full text online from Project Gutenberg
 Goodrow, Sister Esther Marie. Mobile during the Civil War. Mobile, Alabama: Historic Mobile Preservation Society, 1950.
 Hoole, William Stanley. Alabama Tories: The First Alabama Cavalry, U.S.A., 1862-1865. Tuscaloosa, Alabama: 1960.
 Martin, Bessie. Desertion of Alabama Troops from the Confederate Army. New York: AMS Press, 1988.
 McIlwain, Christopher Lyle. Civil War Alabama. University of Alabama Press, 2016.
 McMillan, Malcolm C. The Disintegration of a Confederate State: Three Governors and Alabama's Wartime Home Front, 1861–1865. Macon, Georgia: Mercer University Press, 1986.
 Noe, Kenneth W. et al. eds. The Yellowhammer War: The Civil War and Reconstruction in Alabama. University Alabama Press, 2014. .
 Rigdon, John. A Guide to Alabama Civil War Research. 2011.
 Sterkx, H. E. Partners in Rebellion: Alabama Women in the Civil War. Rutherford, New Jersey: Fairleigh Dickinson University Press, 1970.
 Storey, Margaret M. "Civil War Unionists and the Political Culture of Loyalty in Alabama, 1860-1861." Journal of Southern History (2003): 71-106. in JSTOR
 Storey, Margaret M., Loyalty and Loss: Alabama's Unionists in the Civil War and Reconstruction. Baton Rouge: Louisiana State University Press, 2004.
 Towns, Peggy Allen. Duty Driven: The Plight of North Alabama's African Americans During the Civil War. 2012.

Primary sources For Alabama
 Cutrer, Thomas W. Oh, What a Lonesome Time I Had: The Civil War Letters of Major William Morel Moxley, Eighteenth Alabama Infantry, and Emily Beck Moxley. University of Alabama Press, 2002.
 Hague, Parthenia Antoinette. A blockaded family: life in southern Alabama during the Civil War. University of Nebraska Press, 2008 reprint of 1888 memoir.
 MacMillan, Malcolm,  and C. Peter Ripley, eds. The Alabama Confederate Reader: An Exciting Story of the Civil War in Alabama. 1992.
 Severance, Ben H. Portraits of Conflict: A Photographic History of Alabama in the Civil War. 2012.
 Rogers, Jr., William W. Confederate Home Front: Montgomery During the Civil War. Tuscaloosa, Alabama: University of Alabama Press, 2002.

Arizona Territory
 Masich, Andrew E. The Civil War in Arizona: The Story of the California Volunteers, 1861–1865. Norman, Oklahoma: University of Oklahoma Press, 2012.

Arkansas
 Bailey, Anne J., and Daniel E. Sutherland. "The history and historians of Civil War Arkansas." Arkansas Historical Quarterly 58.3 (1999): 232-63.  in JSTOR, historiography.
 Bailey, Anne, and Daniel E. Sutherland, editors. Civil War Arkansas: Beyond Battles and Leaders. Fayetteville, Arkansas: University of Arkansas Press, 2000.
 Bradbury, John F. "'Buckwheat Cake Philanthropy': Refugees and the Union Army in the Ozarks." Arkansas Historical Quarterly 57.3 (1998): 233-254. in JSTOR
 Christ, Mark K.  Civil War Arkansas, 1863: The Battle for a State. Norman, Oklahoma: University of Oklahoma Press, 2010. 
 Christ, Mark K., ed. Rugged and Sublime: the Civil War in Arkansas. Fayetteville, Arkansas: University of Arkansas Press, 1994.
 DeBlack, Thomas A. With Fire and Sword: Arkansas, 1861-1874. Fayetteville, Arkansas: University of Arkansas Press, 2003.
 Dillard, Tom. "To the Back of the Elephant: Racial Conflict in the Arkansas Republican Party." Arkansas Historical Quarterly 33.1 (1974): 3-15. in JSTOR
 Donovan, Timothy Paul, Willard B. Gatewood, and Jeannie M. Whayne, eds. The Governors of Arkansas: Essays in Political Biography. University of Arkansas Press, 1995.
 Dougan, Michael B. Confederate Arkansas: The People and Policies of a Frontier State in Wartime. University, Alabama: University of Alabama Press, 1976.
 
 Ingenthron, Elmo. Border–Land Rebellion: A History of the Civil War on the Missouri–Arkansas Border. Bronson, Missouri: Ozarks Mountaineer, 1980.
 Moneyhon, Carl H. The Impact of the Civil War and Reconstruction on Arkansas: Persistence in the Midst of Ruin. Baton Rouge, Louisiana: Louisiana State University Press, 1994.
 Thomas David Y. Arkansas in War and Reconstruction, 1861–1874. Little Rock, Arkansas: Arkansas Division, United Daughters of the Confederacy, 1926.
 Woods, James M. Rebellion and Realignment: Arkansas's Road to Secession. Fayetteville, Arkansas: University of Arkansas Press, 1987.
 Wright, Marcus J. Arkansas in the War, 1861 – 1865. Batesville, Arkansas: Independence County Historical Society, 1963.

California
 Matthews, Glenna. The Golden State in the Civil War: Thomas Starr King, the Republican Party, and the Birth of Modern California. Cambridge University Press, 2012.
 Orton, Richard H. Records of California Men in the War of the Rebellion 1861 to 1867. Sacramento, California: State Printing Office, 1890.
 Richards, Leonard L. The California Gold Rush and the Coming of the Civil War. New York: Knopf, 2007.

Colorado
 Whitford, W.C. Colorado Volunteers in the Civil War. Glorieta: Rio Grande Press, 1989.

Connecticut
 Croffut, W.A. and John M. Morris. The Military and Civil History of Connecticut During the War of 1861–65. Bristol, New Hampshire: R. W. Musgrove, 1893.
 Hines, Blaikie. Civil War Volunteer Sons of Connecticut. Thomaston, Maine: American Patriot Press, 2002.
 Niven, John. Connecticut for the Union: The Role of the State in the Civil War. New Haven, Connecticut: Yale University Press, 1965.
 Warshauer, Matthew. Connecticut in the American Civil War: Slavery, Sacrifice, & Survival. Middletown, Connecticut: Wesleyan University Press, 2011. .

Delaware
 Hancock Harold. Delaware during the Civil War. Historical Society of Delaware, 1961.
 Harris, William C. Lincoln and the Border States: Preserving the Union. Lawrence, Kansas: University Press of Kansas: 2011.

District of Columbia
 Adelman, Gary E., and John J. Richtor, editors. Ninety-Nine Historic Images of Civil War Washington. Washington, D.C.: The Center for Civil War Photography and the Civil War Preservation Trust, 2006.
 Benjamin, Marcus, collector/editor. Washington during War Time: A Series of Papers Showing the Military, Political, and Social Phases during 1861-1865. Washington, D.C.: Committee on Literature for the Thirty Sixth Encampment of the Grand Army of the Republic, 1902.
 Cooling, Benjamin Franklin. Jubal Early's Raid on Washington, 1864. Baltimore: Nautical & Aviation Publishing Company of America, 1989. .
 Cooling, B. Franklin. Mr. Lincoln's Forts: A Guide to the Civil War Defenses of Washington. Shippensburg, Pennsylvania: White Mane Publishing Company, 1988.
 Cooling, B. Franklin. Symbol, Sword, and Shield: Defending Washington during the Civil War. Hamden, Connecticut: Archon Books, 1975.
 Furgurson, Ernest B. Freedom Rising: Washington in the Civil War. New York: Alfred A. Knopf, 2004.
 Lee, Richard M. Mr. Lincoln's City: an Illustrated Guide to the Civil War Sites of Washington. McLean, Virginia: BPM Publications, 1981.
 Mitchell, Mary. Divided Town: A Study of Georgetown, D.C., during the Civil War. Barre, Massachusetts: Barre Publishing, 1968.
 Sedgwick, Paul. The Symbol and the Sword: Washington, D.C., 1860-1865. Washington, D.C.: District of Columbia Civil War Centennial Commission, 1962.
 Winkle, Kenneth J. Lincoln's Citadel: The Civil War in Washington, D.C. W.W. Norton, 2013. .

Florida
 Brack, Gloria Conaty. This Endless Wail: The Story of the Civil War in Florida. AuthorHouse, 2006.
 Buker, George. Blockaders, Refugees, and Contrabands: Civil War on Florida's Gulf Coast, 1861-1865. Tuscaloosa: Fire Ant Books, 2004. .
 Davis, William Watson. The Civil War and Reconstruction in Florida. New York: Columbia University Press, 1913.
 Dodd, Dorothy. Florida in the War, 1861–1865. Tallahassee, Florida: Peninsular Publishing, 1959.
 Driscoll, John K. The Civil War on Pensacola Bay, 1861–1862. Jefferson, North Carolina: McFarland & Company, Inc., 2013. .
 Fretwell, Jacqueline K., editor. Civil War Times in St. Augustine. St. Augustine, Florida: St. Augustine Historical Society, 1988.
 Johns, John E. Florida during the Civil War. Gainesville, Florida: University of Florida Press, 1963.
 Loderhose, Gary. Way Down Upon the Suwannee River: Sketches of Florida During the Civil War. iUniverse, 2000.
 Martin, Richard and Daniel L. Schafer. Jacksonville's Ordeal by Fire: A Civil War History. Jacksonville, Florida: Florida Publishing, 1964.
 Nulty, William H. Confederate Florida: The Road to Olustee. Tuscaloosa: University of Alabama Press, 1994. .
 Pearce, George. Pensacola during the Civil War: A Thorn in the Side of the Confederacy. Gainesville, Florida: University of Florida Press, 2000.
 Revels, Tracy J. Florida's Civil War: Terrible Sacrifices. Macon, Georgia: Mercer University Press, 2016. .
 Schafer, Daniel L. Thunder on the River: The Civil War in Northeast Florida. Gainesville, FL: University Press of Florida, 2010. .
 Taylor, Robert A. Rebel Storehouse: Florida in the Confederate Economy. Tuscaloosa, Alabama: University of Alabama Press, 1995.
 Winsboro, Irvin D.S. Florida's Civil War: Explorations into Conflict, Interpretations and Memory. Florida Historical Society Press, 2007.
 Wynne, Lewis Nicholas, and Robert A. Taylor. Florida in the Civil War. Chicago, Illinois: Arcadia Publishing, 2002. .

Georgia
 Brown, Barry L. and Gordon R. Elwell. Crossroads of Conflict: A Guide to Civil War Sites in Georgia. Athens, Georgia: University of Georgia Press, 2010.
 Bryan, Thomas Conn. Confederate Georgia. Athens, Georgia: University of Georgia Press, 1953.
 Fowler, John D. and David B. Parker, editors. Breaking the Heartland: The Civil War in Georgia. Macon, Georgia: Mercer University Press, 2011. .
 Inscoe, John C., editor The Civil War in Georgia: A New Georgia Encyclopedia Companion. Athens, Georgia: University of Georgia Press, 2011. .
 Iobst, Richard W. Civil War Macon: The History of a Confederate City. Macon, Georgia: Mercer University Press, 2009. .
 Jones, Jacqueline. Saving Savannah: The City and the Civil War. New York: Random House, Inc., 2009.
 King, Jr., Spencer B. Darien: The Death and Rebirth of a Southern Town. (Mercer University Press, 1981).
 Lenz, Richard J. The Civil War in Georgia: An Illustrated Traveler's Guide. Infinity Press, 1995.
 Monroe, Haskell, editor. Yankees A'coming: One Month's Experience During the Invasion of Liberty County, Georgia, 1864-1865. (Tuscaloosa: Confederate Pub. Co., 1959).
 Miles, Jim. Civil War Sites in Georgia. Rutledge Hill Press, 1996.
 Sarris, Jonathan Dean. A Separate Civil War: Communities in Conflict in the Mountain South Charlottesville: University of Virginia Press, 2006.
 Wetherington, Mark V.  Plain Folk's Fight: The Civil War and Reconstruction in Piney Woods Georgia. (U of North Carolina Press, 2005).
 Whites, Lee Ann. The Civil War as a Crisis in Gender: Augusta, Georgia, 1860-1890. Athens, Georgia: University of Georgia Press, 1995.
 Williams, David, Teresa Crisp Williams, and David Carlson.  Plain Folk in a Rich Man's War: Class and Dissent in Confederate Georgia. Gainesville, Florida: University Press of Florida, 2002.

Illinois
 Allardice, Bruce S. "" Illinois is Rotten with Traitors!" The Republican Defeat in the 1862 State Election." Journal of the Illinois State Historical Society (2011): 97-114.
 Bohn, Roger E. "Richard Yates: An Appraisal of his Value as the Civil War Governor of Illinois," Journal of the Illinois State Historical Society Spring/Summer2011, Vol. 104 Issue 1/2, pp 17–37
 Cole, Arthur Charles. The Era of the Civil War 1848-1870 (1919), the standard scholarly history; vol 3 of The Centennial History of Illinois
 Duerkes, Wayne N.  "'I for one am ready to do my part': The initial motivations that inspired men from Northern Illinois to enlist in the U.S. Army, 1861-1862," Journal of the Illinois State Historical Society  (2012) 105#4 pp 313–32
 Hicken, Victor, Illinois in the Civil War, University of Illinois Press. 1991. .
 Karamanski, Theodore J. and Eileen M. McMahon, eds. Civil War Chicago: Eyewitness to History. Ohio University Press, 2015. .
 Karamanski, Theodore J., Rally 'Round the Flag: Chicago and the Civil War. Nelson-Hall, 1993. .
 Levy, George. To Die in Chicago: Confederate Prisoners at Camp Douglas, 1862–65. (2nd ed. 1999) excerpt and text search.
Pierce, Bessie Louise. A History of Chicago: Volume II: From Town to City 1848-1871 (1937)
 Reiff, Janice L., Ann Durkin Keating, and James R. Grossman, eds. The Encyclopedia of Chicago (2005)   online version

Primary sources
 Voss-Hubbard, Mark, ed.  Illinois's War: The Civil War in Documents. (Ohio University Press, 2013) 244 pp. online review

Indian Territory (Oklahoma)
 Britton, Wiley. Memoirs of the Rebellion on the Border. Whitefish, Montana: Kessinger Publishing, 2010. .
 Cantrell, M. L. and Mac Harris, eds. Kepis & Turkey Calls: An Anthology of the War Between the States in Indian Territory. Oklahoma City, Oklahoma: Western Heritage Books, 1982.
 Clampitt, Bradley R. The Civil War and Reconstruction in the Indian Territory. Lincoln, Nebraska: University of Nebraska Press, 2015. .
 Confer, Clarissa W. The Cherokee Nation in the Civil War. Norman, Oklahoma: University of Oklahoma Press, 2007.
 Edwards, Whit. The Prairie was on Fire: Eyewitness Accounts of the Civil War in the Indian Territory. Oklahoma City, Oklahoma: Oklahoma Historical Society, 2001. 
 Fischer, Leroy H., ed. The Civil War in Indian Territory. Los Angeles, California: Morrison, 1974. 
 Franks, Kenny A. Stand Watie and the Agony of the Cherokee Nation. Memphis, Tennessee: Memphis State University Press, 1979.
 Knight, Winfred Red Fox: Stand Watie's Civil War Years in the Indian Territory. Glendale, California: Arthur H. Clark, 1988.
 McBride, Lela J. Opothleyaholo and the Loyal Muscogee: Their Flight to Kansas in the Civil War. Jefferson, North Carolina: McFarland, 1999.
 Lause, Mark A. Race & Radicalism in the Union Army. Urbana and Chicago: University of Illinois Press, 2009.
 Rampp, Lary C., and Donald L. Rampp. The Civil War in the Indian Territory. Austin, Texas: Presidial Press, 1975.
 Spencer, John. The American Civil War in Indian Territory. United Kingdom: Osprey Publishing, 2006. .
 Warde, Mary Jane. When the Wolf Came: The Civil War and the Indian Territory. Fayetteville, Arkansas: University of Arkansas Press, 2013.

Indiana
 Barnhart, John D. "The Impact of the Civil War on Indiana," Indiana Magazine of History (1961) 57#3 pp. 185–224 in JSTOR
 
 
 
 Nation, Richard F. "Violence and the Rights of African Americans in Civil War-Era Indiana," Indiana Magazine of History (2004) 100#3 pp 215–230, online
 Nelson, Jacquelyn S. "The Military Response of the Society of Friends in Indiana to the Civil War," Indiana Magazine of History (1985) 81#2 pp 101–130, on Quakers; online
 Rodgers, Thomas E. "Hoosier Women and the Civil War Home Front," Indiana Magazine of History (2001) 97#2 pp 105–128 online
 Sharp, Walter Rice. "Henry S. Lane and the Formation of the Republican Party in Indiana," Mississippi Valley Historical Review (1920) 7#2 pp. 93–112 in JSTOR
 Stampp, Kenneth M.  Indiana politics during the Civil War (1949); monograph by leading scholar 
 Thornbrough, Emma Lou. Indiana in the Civil War Era, 1850-1880 (1965); the standard scholarly history
 Towne, Stephen E. "Killing the Serpent Speedily: Governor Morton, General Hascall, and the Suppression of the Democratic Press in Indiana, 1863," Civil War History (2006) 52#1 pp 41–65.
 Turner, Ann, ed. A Chronology of Indiana in the Civil War. Indianapolis, Indiana: Indiana Civil War Centennial Commission, 1965.

Primary sources
 Nation, Richard F., and Stephen E. Towne. Indiana's War: The Civil War in Documents (2009), primary sources  excerpt and text search 
Terrell, W.H.H. Indiana in the War of the Rebellion. Report of the Adjutant General (1969), reprinted by Indiana Historical Collections Volume XLI (1960)

Iowa
 Clark, Olynthus B. The Politics of Iowa During the Civil War and Reconstruction (Clio Press, 1911)  online.
 Ingersoll, L.D. Iowa and the Rebellion. Philadelphia, Pennsylvania: J.B. Lippincott & Co., 1867.
 Johnson, Russell L. "The Civil War generation: military service and mobility in Dubuque, Iowa, 1860-1870." Journal of social history (1999): 791-820. in JSTOR
 Lyftogt, Kenneth. From Blue Mills to Columbia: Cedar Falls and the Civil War (Iowa State University Press, 1993).
 Schwalm, Leslie Ann. "" Overrun with free Negroes": emancipation and wartime migration in the Upper Midwest." Civil War History 50.2 (2004): 145-174. online
 Wubben, Hubert H. Civil War Iowa and the Copperhead Movement (Wiley-Blackwell, 1980).
 Wubben, Hubert H. "The Uncertain Trumpet: Iowa Republicans and Black Suffrage, 1860-1868." Annals of Iowa 44 (1984): 409-29.
 Wubben, Hubert H. "Dennis Mahony and the Dubuque Herald, 1860-1863." Iowa Journal of History 56: 289-320.

Kansas
 Castel, Albert. Civil War Kansas: Reaping the Whirlwind. Lawrence, Kansas: University Press of Kansas, 1997. .
 Etcheson, Nicole. Bleeding Kansas: Contested Liberty in the Civil War Era. Topeka, Kansas: University Press of Kansas, 2004.
 Gilmore, Donald L. Civil War on the Missouri–Kansas Border. Gretna, Louisiana: Pelican Publishing Company, 2005. .
 Wood, Larry E. The Civil War on the Lower Kansas–Missouri Border. Hickory Press, 2000.

Kentucky
 Astor, Aaron. Rebels on the Border: Civil War, Emancipation, and the Reconstruction of Kentucky and Missouri (Louisiana State University Press; 2012) 360 pp
 Brown, Kent Masterson. The Civil War in Kentucky: Battle for the Bluegrass State. Campbell, California: Savas Publishing Company, 2000. .
 Bush, Bryan S. Louisville and the Civil War: A History and Guide. Charleston, South Carolina: The History Press, 2008.
 Coulter, E. Merton. The Civil War and Readjustment in Kentucky. Chapel Hill, North Carolina: University of North Carolina Press, 1926.
 Craig, Berry. Kentucky Confederates: Secession, Civil War, and the Jackson Purchase. University Press of Kentucky, 2014. .
 Harris, William C. Lincoln and the Border States: Preserving the Union (University Press of Kansas; 2011) 416 pages
 Harrison, Lowell. The Civil War in Kentucky University Press of Kentucky, 1975.
 Lee, Dan. The Civil War in the Jackson Purchase, 1861–1862: The Pro–Confederate Struggle and Defeat in Southwest Kentucky. McFarland and Company, 2014. .
 Leet, Joshua and Karen M. Leet. Civil War Lexington, Kentucky: Bluegrass Breeding Ground of Power. Charleston, South Carolina: The History Press, 2011.
 McDowell, Robert Emmett. City of Conflict: Louisville in the Civil War, 1861–1865. Louisville, Kentucky: Louisville Civil War Round Table, 1962.
 McKnight, Brian D.  Contested Borderland: The Civil War in Appalachian Kentucky and Virginia. University Press of Kentucky, 2006.
 Priston, John David. The Civil War in the Big Sandy Valley of Kentucky. Gateway Press, 2009.
 Smith, John David. "Whither Kentucky Civil War and Reconstruction Scholarship?." Register of the Kentucky Historical Society 112.2 (2014): 223-247. online

Louisiana
 Ayres, Thomas.  Dark and Bloody Ground: The Battle of Mansfield and the Forgotten Civil War in Louisiana. Dallas, Texas: Taylor Trade, 2001.
 Bragg, Jefferson Davis. Louisiana in the Confederacy. Baton Rouge, Louisiana: Louisiana State University Press, 1941.
 Dimitry, John. Confederate Military History of Louisiana: Louisiana in the Civil War, 1861-1865. 2007.
 Dufrene, Dennis J. Civil War Baton Rouge, Port Hudson and Bayou Sara: Capturing the Mississippi. Charleston, South Carolina: The History Press, 2012. .
 Hollandsworth Jr, James G. The Louisiana Native Guards: The Black Military Experience During the Civil War. Baton Rouge, Louisiana: Louisiana State University Press, 1995.
 Johnson, Ludwell H.  Red River Campaign, Politics & Cotton in the Civil War. Kent State University Press, 1993.
 McCrary, Peyton.  Abraham Lincoln and Reconstruction: The Louisiana Experiment. Princeton, New Jersey: Princeton University Press, 1979.
 Peña, Christopher G. Scarred By War: Civil War in Southeast Louisiana. 2004.
 Ripley, C. Peter. Slaves and Freedmen in Civil War Louisiana. 1976.
 Tunnell, Ted. Crucible of Reconstruction: War, Radicalism, and Race in Louisiana, 1862–1877. Baton Rouge, Louisiana: Louisiana State University Press, 1992.
 Winters, John D. The Civil War in Louisiana. Baton Rouge: Louisiana State University Press, 1963. .

Maine
 Dalton, Peter. Union vs. Dis-Union: The Contribution of a Small Maine Town to the American Civil War, 1861-1865. Union Publishing Company, 1993.
 Gratwick, Harry. Mainers in the Civil War. Charleston, South Carolina: The History Press, 2011. ISBN 9781596299627.
 Whitman, William E.S., and Charles H. True. Maine in the War for the Union: A History of the Part Bourn by Main Troops. Lewiston, Maine: Nelson Dingley, Jr. & Co., 1865.

Maryland
 Adams, Charles S. The Civil War in Washington County, Maryland: A Guide to 66 Points of Interest. Dabsboro, Delaware: published by author, 2001.
 Baker, Jean H. The Politics of Continuity: Maryland Political Parties from 1858 to 1870 Johns Hopkins University Press, 1973.
 Branch, Nathania A., Miles, Monday M. Miles, and Ryan J. Quick. Prince George's County and the Civil War: Life on the Border. Charleston, South Carolina: The History Press, 2013. ISBN 9781609498481.
 Cotton, Robert and Mary Ellen Hayward. Maryland in the Civil War: A House Divided. Baltimore, Maryland: Maryland Historical Society, 1994.
 Cox, Richard P. Civil War Maryland: Stories from the Old Line State. Charleston, South Carolina: The History Press, 2008. ISBN 9781596294196.
 Ezratty, Harry A. Baltimore in the Civil War: The Pratt Street Riot and a City Occupied. Charleston, South Carolina: The History Press, 2010. ISBN 9781609490034.
 Fields, Barbara. Slavery and Freedom on the Middle Ground: Maryland During the Nineteenth Century (1987).
 Floyd, Claudia. Union-Occupied Maryland: A Civil War Chronicle of Civilians & Soldiers. Charleston, South Carolina: The History Press, 2014. ISBN 9781626196117.
 Gordon, Paul and Rita. A Playground of the Civil War: Frederick County, Maryland. Frederick, Maryland: Marken and Bielfeld, 1928.
 Harris, William C. Lincoln and the Border States: Preserving the Union. University Press of Kansas, 2011.
 Keller, Roger S. Events of the Civil War in Washington County, Maryland. Shippensburg, Pennsylvania: White Mane, 1995.
 Klein, Frederick Shriver, ed. Just South of Gettysburg: Carroll County, Maryland in the Civil War. Westminster, Maryland: Carroll County Historical Society, 1963.
 Manakee, Harold R. Maryland in the Civil War. Baltimore, Maryland: Maryland Historical Society, 1961.
 Mills, Eric. Chesapeake Bay in the Civil War. Centreville, Maryland: Tidewaters Publishers, 1997.
 Newman, Harry Wright. Maryland and the Confederacy. Annapolis, Maryland: published by author, 1976.
 Oshell, Robert E. Silver Spring and the Civil War. Charleston, South Carolina: The History Press, 2014. ISBN 9781626194175.
 Schildt, John W. Frederick in the Civil War: Battle and Honor in the Spired City. Charleston, South Carolina: The History Press, 2010. ISBN 9781609490782.
 Toomey, Daniel Carroll. The Civil War in Maryland. Baltimore, Maryland: Toomey Press, 1983.

Massachusetts
 Ellis, Robert P. Northborough in the Civil War: Citizen Soldiering and Sacrifice. Charleston, South Carolina: The History Press, 2007. ISBN 9781596292208.
 Hallett, William. Newburyport and the Civil War. Charleston, South Carolina: The History Press, 2012. ISBN 9781609494483.
 Miller, Stauffer. Cape Cod and the Civil War: The Raised Right Arm. Charleston, South Carolina: The History Press, 2010. .
 Patrakis, Joan Silva. Andover in the Civil War: The Spirit and Sacrifice of a New England Town. Charleston, South Carolina: The History Press, 2008. ISBN 9781596294370.

Michigan
 Bak, Richard. A Distant Thunder: Michigan in the Civil War. Chelsea: Huron River, 2004.
 Dempsey, Jack. Michigan and the Civil War: A Great and Bloody Sacrifice. Charleston, South Carolina: The History Press, 2011.
 Mason, Philip P. and Paul J. Pentecost. From Bull Run to Appomattox: Michigan's Role in the Civil War. Detroit, Michigan: Wayne State University Press, 1961.
 Robertson, John. Michigan in the War. Lansing, Michigan: W. S. George & Co., 1882.

Minnesota
 Andrews, C. C. Minnesota in the Civil and Indian Wars, 1861–65. St. Paul, Minnesota: 1891.
 Carley, Kenneth. Minnesota in the Civil War: An Illustrated History. St. Paul, Minnesota: Minnesota Historical Society, 2005.

Mississippi
 Ballard, Michael B. The Civil War in Mississippi: Major Campaigns and Battles. Jackson, Mississippi: University Press of Mississippi, 2011. .
 Barney, William L. The Secessionist Impulse: Alabama and Mississippi in 1860. Princeton, New Jersey: Princeton University Press, 1974.
 Burns, Zed. Ship Island and the Confederacy. Hattiesburg, Mississippi: University and College Press of Mississippi, 1971.
 Enzweiler, Stephen. Oxford in the Civil War: Battle for a Vanquished Land. Charleston, South Carolina: The History Press, 2010. ISBN 9781596293182.
 Jenkins, Sally and John Stauffer. The State of Jones: The Small Southern County that Seceded from the Confederacy. New York: Anchor Books, 2009. .

Missouri
 Arenson, Adam. The Great Heart of the Republic: St. Louis and the Cultural Civil War. Cambridge, Massachusetts: Harvard University Press, 2011. .
 Astor, Aaron. Rebels on the Border: Civil War, Emancipation, and the Reconstruction of Kentucky and Missouri. Louisiana State University Press, 2012.
 Bartels, Carolyn. The Civil War in Missouri: Day by Day, 1861 to 1865. Shawnee Mission, Kansas: Two Trails, 1992.
 Boman, Dennis K. Lincoln's Resolute Unionist: Hamilton Gamble, Dred Scott Dissenter and Missouri's Civil War Governor. Louisiana State University Press, 2006.
 Erwin, James W. Guerrillas in Civil War Missouri. Charleston, South Carolina: The History Press, 2012. ISBN 9781609493882.
 Erwin, James W. Guerrilla Hunters in Civil War Missouri. Charleston, South Carolina: The History Press, 2013. ISBN 9781609497453.
 Erwin, James W. The Homefront in Civil War Missouri. Charleston, South Carolina: The History Press, 2014. ISBN 9781626194335.
 Fellman, Michael. Inside War: The Guerrilla Conflict in Missouri during the American Civil War (1989).
 Fitzsimmons, Margaret Louise. "Missouri Railroads During the Civil War and Reconstruction." Missouri Historical Review 35#2 (1941)  pp. 188–206
 Geiger, Mark W.  Financial Fraud and Guerrilla Violence in Missouri's Civil War, 1861–1865.  Yale University Press, 2010.
 Gerteis, Louis S., Civil War St. Louis. Lawrence, Kansas: University Press of Kansas, 2001. .
 Gerteis, Louis S., The Civil War in Missouri: A Military History. Columbia, Missouri: University of Missouri Press, 2012. .
 Gilmore, Donald L. Civil War on the Missouri–Kansas Border. Gretna, Louisiana: Pelican Publishing Company, 2005. .
 Harris, William C. Lincoln and the Border States: Preserving the Union. Lawrence, Kansas: University Press of Kansas, 2011.
 Hess, Earl J. "The 12th Missouri Infantry: A Socio-Military Profile of a Union Regiment," Missouri Historical Review (October 1981) 76#1 pp 53–77.
 Kamphoefner, Walter D., "Missouri Germans and the Cause of Union and Freedom," Missouri Historical Review, 106#2 (April 2012), 115-36.
 Lause, Mark A. Price's Lost Campaign: The 1864 Invasion of Missouri. Columbia, Missouri: University of Missouri Press, 2011.
 Lause, Mark A. The Collapse of Price’s Raid: the Beginning of the End in Civil War Missouri. Columbia, Missouri: University of Missouri Press, 2016.
 McGhee, James E. Guide to Missouri Confederate Units, 1861-1865. University of Arkansas Press, 2008.
 Nichols, Bruce. Guerilla Warfare in Civil War Missouri, 1862. Jefferson, North Carolina: McFarland & Company, 2004.
 Parrish, William E. A History of Missouri, Volume III: 1860 to 1875. 1973, reprinted 2002. .
 Parrish, William E. Turbulent Partnership: Missouri and the Union, 1861-1865. Columbia, Missouri: University of Missouri Press, 1963.
 Phillips, Christopher.  Missouri's Confederate:  Claiborne Fox Jackson and the Creation of Southern Identity in the Border West. Columbia, Missouri: University of Missouri Press, 2000. .
 Potter, Marguerite. "Hamilton R. Gamble, Missouri's War Governor." Missouri Historical Review 35#1 (1940): 25-72
 Stith, Matthew M. "At the Heart of Total War: Guerrillas, Civilians, and the Union Response in Jasper County, Missouri, 1861-1865," Military History of the West 38#1 (2008), 1-27.
 Thoma, James F. This Cruel Unnatural War: The American Civil War in Cooper County, Missouri. Kingsport, Tennessee: James F. Thoma, 2003.
 Wood, Larry. Civil War Springfield. Charleston, South Carolina: The History Press, 2011. .
 Wood, Larry E. The Civil War on the Lower Kansas–Missouri Border. Hickory Press, 2000.

Primary sources
 Siddali, Silvana R., ed. Missouri's War: The Civil War in Documents. Athens: Ohio University Press, 2009.

Montana Territory
 Robison, Ken. Confederates in Montana Territory: In the Shadow of Price's Army. Charleston, South Carolina: The History Press, 2014. ISBN 9781626196032.
 Robison, Ken. Montana Territory and the Civil War: A Frontier Forged on the Battlefield. Charleston, South Carolina: The History Press, 2013. ISBN 9781626191754.

Nebraska
 Potter, James E. Standing Firmly by the Flag: Nebraska Territory and the Civil War, 1861–1867. Omaha, Nebraska: Nebraska State Historical Society, 2012. .

New Hampshire
 Cleveland, Mather. New Hampshire Fights the Civil War. New London, New Hampshire: published by author, 1969.
 Heald, Bruce D. New Hampshire and the Civil War: Voices from the Granite State. Charleston, South Carolina: The History Press, 2012. ISBN 9781609496289.
 Waite, Otis F.B. New Hampshire in the Great Rebellion. Claremont, New Hampshire: Tracy, Chase & Co., 1870.

New Jersey
 Bilby, Joseph G. and William C. Goble. "Remember you are Jerseymen!": A Military History of New Jersey's Troops in the Civil War. Longstreet House, 1998.
 Jackson, William J. New Jerseyans in the Civil War: For Union and Liberty. New Brunswick, New Jersey: Rutgers University Press, 2000.
 Rajoppi, Joanne Hamilton. New Brunswick and the Civil War: The Brunswick Boys in the Great Rebellion. Charleston, South Carolina: The History Press, 2013. ISBN 9781626191747.
 Siegel, Alan A. For the Glory of the Union: Myth, Reality, and the Media in Civil War New Jersey. Rutherford, New Jersey: Fairleigh Dickinson University Press, 1984.

New Mexico Territory
 Cottrell, Steve. Civil War in Texas and New Mexico Territory. Gretna, Louisiana: Pelican Publishing Company, Inc., 1998. .
 Ganaway, Loomis Morton. New Mexico and the Sectional Controversy, 1846–1861. Santa Fe, New Mexico: Historical Society of New Mexico, 1944.
 Grinstead, Mario C. Life and Death of a Frontier Fort: Fort Craig, New Mexico, 1854–1885. Socorro: Socorro County Historical Society, 1973
 Keleher, W.A. Turmoil in New Mexico: 1848–1868. Santa Fe, New Mexico: Rydal Press, 1952.
 Pittman, Walter Earl. New Mexico and The Civil War. Charleston, South Carolina: The History Press, 2011. 
 Stanley, F. The Civil War in New Mexico. Denver, Colorado: The World Press, 1960.

New York
 Cook, Adrian. The Armies of the Streets: The New York City Draft Riots of 1863. Lexington, Kentucky: University Press of Kentucky, 1979.
 Hunt, Harrison, and Bill Bleyer. Long Island and the Civil War: Queens, Nassau and Suffolk Counties During the War Between the States. The History Press, 2015. ISBN 9781626197718.
 McKay, Ernest A. The Civil War and New York City. Syracuse, New York: Syracuse University Press, 1990.
 Phisterer, Frederick. New York in the War of the Rebellion, 1861–1865. Albany, New York: J. B. Lyon and Company, 1912.
 Plank, Will. Banners and Bugles: a Record of Ulster County, New York and the Mid–Hudson Region in the Civil War. Marlborough, New York: Centennial Press, 1963.
 Snyder, Charles. Oswego County, New York in the Civil War. Oswego County Historical Society, 1962.
 Spann, Edward K. Gotham at War: New York City, 1860-1865. Wilmington, Delaware: Scholarly Resources, 2002.

North Carolina
 Barrett, John G. The Civil War in North Carolina. Chapel Hill, North Carolina: University of North Carolina Press, 1963. .
 Browning, Judkin. Shifting Loyalties: The Union Occupation of Eastern North Carolina. Chapel Hill, North Carolina: University of North Carolina Press, 2011. .
 Carbone, John S. The Civil War in Coastal North Carolina. Division of Archives and History, North Carolina Department of Cultural Resources, 2001.
 Casstevens, Frances H. The Civil War and Yadkin County, North Carolina: A History, with Contemporary Photographs and Letters; New Evidence Regarding Home Guard Activity and the Shootout at the Bond School House; a Roster of Militia Officers; the Names of Yadkin Men at Appomattox; and 1200 Confederate Army and Navy Service Records with Parents, Vital Dates, and Place of Burial for Most. Jefferson, North Carolina: McFarland & Company, Inc., 2005. .
 Crawford, Martin. Ashe County's Civil War: Community and Society in the Appalachian South. Charlottesville, Virginia: University Press of Virginia, 2001.
 Hardy, Michael C. Civil War Charlotte: The Last Capital of the Confederacy. Charleston, South Carolina: The History Press, 2012. ISBN 9781609494803.
 Hardy, Michael C. North Carolina in the Civil War. Charleston, South Carolina: The History Press: 2011. Excerpt and text search
 Hardy, Michael C. Watauga County, North Carolina, in the Civil War. Charleston, South Carolina: The History Press, 2013. ISBN 9781609498887.
 Inscoe, John C. and Gordon B. McKinney. The Heart of Confederate Appalachia: Western North Carolina in the Civil War. Chapel Hills, North Carolina: University of North Carolina Press, 2000.
 Mallison, Fred M. The Civil War on the Outer Banks: A History of the Late Rebellion Along the Coast of North Carolina from Carteret to Currituck, with Comments on Prewar Conditions and an Account of Postwar Recovery. Jefferson, North Carolina: McFarland & Company, Inc., 2005. .
 Meekins, Alex C. Elizabeth City, North Carolina and the Civil War. Charleston, South Carolina: The History Press, 2007. .
 Moore, Carol. Guilford County and the Civil War. Charleston, South Carolina: The History Press, 2015. ISBN 9781626198494.
 Reid, Richard M. Freedom for Themselves: North Carolina's Black Soldiers in the Civil War Era. 2008. excerpt and text search
 Silkenat, David. "Driven from Home: North Carolina's Civil War Refugee Crisis". 2016. 
 Silkenat, David. Moments of Despair: Suicide, Divorce, and Debt in Civil War Era North Carolina. Chapel Hill, North Carolina: University of North Carolina Press, 2011. .
 Sitterson, Joseph Carlyle. The Secession Movement in North Carolina. Chapel Hill, North Carolina: University of North Carolina Press, 1939.
 Trotter, William R. Silk Flags and Cold Steel: The Civil War in North Carolina: The Piedmont. Winston-Salem, North Carolina: John F. Blair, Publisher, 1988. .

Primary sources
 Clinard, Karen L.  And Richard Russell, eds. Fear in North Carolina: The Civil War Journals and Letters of the Henry Family. 2008. excerpt and text search

Ohio
 (no author listed) Official Roster of the Soldiers of the State of Ohio in the War of the Rebellion, 1861-1866, twelve  volumes. Cincinnati, Ohio: The Ohio Valley Press, 1888.

Official roster of the soldiers of the state of Ohio in the War of the Rebellion, 1861-1866 vol III
Official roster of the soldiers of the state of Ohio in the War of the Rebellion, 1861-1866 vol VI
Official roster of the soldiers of the state of Ohio in the War of the Rebellion, 1861-1866, Vol VII
Official roster of the soldiers of the state of Ohio in the War of the Rebellion, 1861-1866 vol IX
Official roster of the soldiers of the state of Ohio in the War of the Rebellion, 1861-1866, Vol XI 
Official roster of the soldiers of the state of Ohio in the War of the Rebellion, 1861-1866, Vol XII
 Hall, Susan G. Appalachian Ohio and the Civil War, 1862–1863. Jefferson, North Carolina: McFarland & Company, Inc., 2008. .
 
 Murdock, Eugene C. Ohio's Bounty System in the Civil War. Columbus, Ohio: Ohio State University Press, 1963.
 Reid, Whitlaw. Ohio in the War: Her Statesmen, Generals and Soldiers. Cincinnati, Ohio: 1868.
 Thomas, Dale. Civil War Soldiers of Greater Cleveland: Letters Home to Cuyshoga County. Charleston, South Carolina: The History Press, 2013. .

Oregon
 Fletcher, Randol B. Hidden History of Civil War Oregon. Charleston, South Carolina: The History Press, 2011. .

Pennsylvania
 Barcousky, Len. Civil War Pittsburgh: Forge of the Union. Charleston, South Carolina: The History Press, 2013. .
 Blair, William and William Pencak, editors. Making and Remaking Pennsylvania's Civil War. University Park, Pennsylvania: Penn State University Press, 2004.
 Fox, Arthur B. Our Honored Dead: Alleghany County, Pennsylvania, in the American Civil War. Chicora, Pennsylvania: Mechling Bookbindery, 2008.
 Fox, Arthur B. Pittsburgh During the American Civil War 1860–1865. Chicora, Pennsylvania: Mechling Bookbindery, 2002.
 Greater Chambersburg Chamber of Commerce. Southern Revenge: Civil War History of Chambersburg, Pennsylvania. Chambersburg, Pennsylvania: Greater Chambersburg Chamber of Commerce, 1989.
 Miller, William J. The Training of an Army: Camp Curtin and the North's Civil War. Shippensburg, Pennsylvania: White Mane, 1990.
 Sandou, Robert M. Deserter County: Civil War Opposition in the Pennsylvania Appalachians. Fordham University Press, 2009.
 Skinner, George W., ed. Pennsylvania at Chickamauga and Chattanooga: Ceremonies at the Dedication of the Monuments Erected by the Commonwealth of Pennsylvania. Harrisburg, Pennsylvania: Wm. Stanley Ray, State Printer, 1897.
 Taylor, Frank H. Philadelphia in the Civil War. Philadelphia, Pennsylvania: The city, 1913.
 Wingert, Cooper H. Harrisburg and the Civil War: Defending the Keystone of the Union. Charleston, South Carolina: The History Press, 2013. .
 Young, Ronald C. Lancaster County, Pennsylvania in the Civil War. Lancaster, Pennsylvania: published by the author, 2003.

South Carolina
 Cauthen, Charles Edward. South Carolina Goes to War. Chapel Hill, North Carolina: University of North Carolina Press, 1956.
 Lee, J. Edward and Ron Chepesiuk, eds. South Carolina in the Civil War: The Confederate Experience in Letters and Diaries. Jefferson, North Carolina: McFarland & Company, Inc., 2004. .
 Poole, W. Scott. South Carolina's Civil War: A Narrative History. Macon, Georgia: Mercer University Press, 2005.
 Racine, Philip N. Living a Big War in a Small Place: Spartanburg, South Carolina, During the Confederacy. Columbia, South Carolina: University of South Carolina Press, 2013. .
 Rosen, Robert N. Confederate Charleston: An Illustrated History of the City and the People During the Civil War. Columbia, South Carolina: University of South Carolina Press, 1995.
 Stokes, Karen. Confederate South Carolina: True Stories of Civilians, Soldiers and the War. The History Press, 2015. ISBN 9781626198203.

Tennessee
 Ash, Steven V. Middle Tennessee Transformed, 1860–1870. Baton Rouge, Louisiana: Louisiana State University Press, 1988.
 Astor, Aaron. The Civil War along Tennessee's Cumberland Plateau. The History Press, 2015. ISBN 9781626194045.
 Augustus, Gerald L. The Loudon County Area of East Tennessee in the War, 1861–1865. Paducah, Kentucky: Turner Publishing Company, 2000.
 Civil War Centennial Commission of Tennessee. Tennesseans in the Civil War: A Military History of Confederate and Union Units with Available Rosters of Personnel. In Two Parts. Nashville: Civil War Centennial Commission, 1964, 1965. Reprinted Knoxville: University of Tennessee Press, 1981, 1984. .
 Connelly, Thomas L. Civil War Tennessee: Battles and Leaders. Knoxville: The University of Tennessee Press, 1979. .
 Fisher, Noel C. War at Every Door: Partisan Politics & Guerilla Violence in East Tennessee, 1860–1869. Chapel Hill, North Carolina: University of North Carolina Press, 1997.
 Groce, W. Todd. Mountain Rebels: East Tennessee Confederates and the Civil War. Knoxville, Tennessee: University of Tennessee Press. .
 Humes, Thomas W. The Loyal Mountaineers of Tennessee. Knoxville, Tennessee: Ogden Brothers and Company, 1888.
 Lepa, Jack H. The Civil War in Tennessee, 1862–1863. Jefferson, North Carolina: McFarland & Company, 2007.
 Maslowski Peter. Treason Must Be Made Odious: Military Occupation and Wartime Reconstruction in Nashville, Tennessee, 1862-65. 1978.
 Patton, James W. Unionism and Reconstruction in Tennessee, 1860-1867. Chapel Hill, North Carolina University of North Carolina Press, 1934.
 Seymour, Digby Gordon and David Richer. Divided Loyalties: Fort Sanders and the Civil War in East Tennessee. East Tennessee Historical Society, 1982.
 Sheeler, J. Reuben. "Secession and The Unionist Revolt," Journal of Negro History, Vol. 29, No. 2 (Apr., 1944), pp. 175–185 in JSTOR, covers east Tennessee
 Temple, Oliver. East Tennessee and the Civil War. Cincinnati, Ohio: The R. Clarke Company, 1899.

Texas
 Bell, Walter F. "Civil War Texas: A Review of the Historical Literature." Southwestern Historical Quarterly 109.2 (2005): 204–232. in JSTOR
 Baum, Dale. The Shattering of Texas Unionism: Politics in the Lone Star State during the Civil War Era. Baton Rouge, Louisiana: Louisiana State University Press, 1998.
 Buenger, Walter L. Secession and the union in Texas. Austin, Texas: University of Texas Press, 1984.
 Burke, Johanna. The American Civil War in Texas. Rosen Publishing Group, 2010.
 Cotham, Edward Terrel. Battle on the Bay: The Civil War Struggle for Galveston. University of Texas Press, 1998.
 Cottrell, Steve. Civil War in Texas and New Mexico Territory. Gretna, Louisiana: Pelican Publishing Company, Inc., 1998. .
 Gallaway, B.P., ed. Texas, The Dark Corner of the Confederacy: Contemporary Accounts of the Lone Star State in the Civil War. Lincoln, Nebraska: University of Nebraska Press, 1994.
 Grear, Charles David. Why Texans Fought in the Civil War. College Station, Texas: Texas A&M University Press, 2010.
 Grear, Charles David, editor. The Fate of Texas: The Civil War and the Lone Star State. Fayetteville, Arkansas: University of Arkansas Press, 2008.
 Hall, Andrew W. Civil War Blockade Running on the Texas Coast. Charleston, South Carolina: The History Press, 2014.
 Howell, Kenneth W., ed. The Seventh Star of the Confederacy: Texas in the Civil War. University of North Texas Press, 2009. excerpt
 Irby, James A. Backdoor at Bagdad: The Civil War on the Rio Grande. El Paso, Texas: Texas Western Press, 1977.
 Jewett, Clayton. Texas in the Confederacy: An Experiment in Nation Building. Columbia, Missouri: University of Missouri Press, 2002.
 Lawrence, F. Lee and Robert Glover. Camp Ford, C.S.A.: The Story of Union Prisoners in Texas. Austin, Texas: Texas Civil War Centennial Advisory Committee, 1964.
 Marten, James A. Texas Divided: Loyalty and Dissent in the Lone Star State, 1856–1874. Lexington, Kentucky: University Press of Kentucky, 1990.
 McCaslin, Richard B. Tainted Breeze: The Great Hanging at Gainesville, Texas, 1862. Baton Rouge, Louisiana: Louisiana State University Press, 1994.
 Pickering, David and Jud Falls. Bush Men and Vigilantes; Civil War Dissent in Texas. College Station, Texas: Texas A&M University Press, 2000.
 Schmidt, James M. Galveston and the Civil War: An Island City in the Maelstrom. Charleston, South Carolina: The History Press, 2012.
 Simpson, Hard B., ed. and Marcus J. Wright, comp. Texas in the Civil War, 1861–1865. Hillsboro, Texas: Hill Junior College Press, 1965
 Smith, David Paul. Frontier Defense in the Civil War: Texas' Rangers and Rebels. Texas A&M University Press, 1992. .
 Spaw, Patsy M. The Texas Senate: Civil War to the Eve of Reform, 1861–1889, two volumes. College Station, Texas: Texas A&M University Press, 1999.
 Teja, Jesús F. de la.Lone Star Unionism, Dissent, and Resistance: Other Sides of Civil War Texas. 2016. 
 Townsend, Stephen A. The Yankee Invasion of Texas Texas A&M University Press, 2006.
 Wilbarger, J.W. Indian Depredations in Texas. Austin, Texas: Hutchings Printing House, 1889.
 Winsor, Bill. Texas in the Confederacy: Military Installations, Economy, and People. Hillsboro, Texas: Hill Junior College Press, 1978.
 Wooster, Ralph A. Texas and Texans in the Civil War. Austin, Texas: Eakin Press, 1995.
 Wooster, Robert, and Ralph Wooster, eds. Lone Star Blue and Gray: Essays on Texas and the Civil War Texas A&M University Press, 2015.
 Wright, Marcus J., comp., and Harold B. Simpson, editor. Texas in the War, 1861–1865. Hillsboro, Texas: Hill Junior College Press, 1965.
 Young, Kevin R. To the Tyrants Never Yield: A Texas Civil War Sampler. Plano Texas: Wordware, 1992.

Utah Territory
 Long, E.B. The Saints and the Union: Utah Territory during the Civil War. Champiagn, Illinois: University of Illinois Press, 1981.
 Maxwell, John Gary. The Civil War Years in Utah: The Kingdom of God and the Territory That Did Not Fight. 2016.

Vermont
 Benedict, George G. Vermont in the Civil War. Burlington, Vermont: Free Press Printing Co., 1908.
 Coffin, Howard. Full Duty: Vermonters in the Civil War. Woodstock, Vermont: The Countryman Press, Inc., 1993.
 Morgan, William Bennington and the Civil War. Charleston, South Carolina: The History Press, 2013. ISBN 9781626191716.
 Watie, Otis F. R. Vermont in the Great Rebellion, Containing Historical and Biographical Sketches, Etc. Claremont, New Hampshire: Tracy, Chase & Co., 1869.
 Zeller, Paul G. Williamstown, Vermont in the Civil War. Charleston, South Carolina: The History Press, 2010. .

Virginia
 Aubrecht, Michael. The Civil War in Spotsylvania County: Confederate Campfires at the Crossroads. Charleston, South Carolina: The History Press, 2009. ISBN 9781596296961.
 Barber, James G. Alexandria in the Civil War. Lynchburg, Virginia: H. E. Howard Co., 1988.
 Bearss, Edwin C. River of Lost Opportunities: The Civil War on the James River, 1861–1865. Lynchburg, Virginia: H.E. Howard, 1986.
 Bill, Alfred Hoyt. The Beleuguered City: Richmond, 1861 – 1865. New York: Knopf, 1946.
 Blair, William. Virginia's Private War: Feeding Body and Soul in the Confederacy, 1861-1865. New York: Oxford University Press, 1998.
 Brewer, James H. The Confederate Negro: Virginia's Craftsmen and Military Laborers, 1861–1865. Tuscaloosa, Alabama: University of Alabama Press, 2007.
 Brubaker, John H. The Last Capital: Danville, Virginia, and the Final Days of the Confederacy. Danville, Virginia: Danville Museum of Fine Arts and History, 1979.
 Cowgill, John A. The Great Schism: The Dividing of Virginia During the American Civil War. CreateSpace, 2011.
 Davis, Wiliam C. and James I. Robertson, Jr., eds. Virginia at War 1861. Lexington, Kentucky: University Press of Kentucky, 2005. .
 Davis, Wiliam C. and James I. Robertson, Jr., eds. Virginia at War 1862. Lexington, Kentucky: University Press of Kentucky, 2007. .
 Davis, Wiliam C. and James I. Robertson, Jr., eds. Virginia at War 1863. Lexington, Kentucky: University Press of Kentucky, 2009. .
 Davis, Wiliam C. and James I. Robertson, Jr., eds. Virginia at War 1864. Lexington, Kentucky: University Press of Kentucky, 2009. .
 Davis, Wiliam C. and James I. Robertson, Jr., eds. Virginia at War 1865. Lexington, Kentucky: University Press of Kentucky, 2012. .
 Driver, Jr., Robert J. Lexington and Rockbridge County in the Civil War. Lynchburg, Virginia: H.E. Howard, 1989.
 Dubbs, Carol Kettenburg. Defend This Old Town: Williamsburg during the Civil War. Baton Rouge, Louisiana: Louisiana State University Press, 2002.
 Duncan, Richard B. Beleaguered Winchester: A Virginia Community at War, 1861-1865. Baton Rouge, Louisiana: Louisiana State University Press, 2007.
 Gage, Anthony J. Southside Virginia in the Civil War: Amelia, Brunswick, Charlotte, Halifax, Lunenburg, Mecklenburg, Nottoway & Prince Edward Counties. Lynchburg, Virginia: H.E. Howard, 1999.
 Gold, Thomas D. History of Clarke County, Virginia and Its Connection with the War Between the States. Berryville, Virginia: no publisher listed, 1914.
 Greene, A. Wilson. Civil War Petersburg: Confederate City in the Crucible of War. Charlottesville, Virginia: University of Virginia Press, 2006.
 Hearn, Chester G. Six Years of Hell: Harpers Ferry During the Civil War. Baton Rouge, Louisiana: Louisiana State University Press, 1996.
 Henderson, William D. Petersburg in the Civil War: War at the Door. Lynchburg, Virginia: H.E. Howard, 1998.
 Heuvel, Sean M. and Lisa L. Heuvel. The College of William and Mary in the Civil War. Jefferson, North Carolina: McFarland & Company, Inc., 2013. .
 Kleese, Richard B. Shenandoah County in the Civil War: The Turbulent Years. Lynchburg, Virginia: H. E. Howard, 1992.
 Krick, Robert K. Civil War Weather in Virginia. Tuscaloosa, Alabama: University of Alabama Press, 2007.
 Lankford, Nelson. Richmond Burning: The Last Days of the Confederate Capital. New York: Viking, 2002. .
 McKnight, Brian D.  Contested Borderland: The Civil War in Appalachian Kentucky and Virginia. University Press of Kentucky, 2006.
 Mahan, Michael G. The Shenandoah Valley, 1861–1865: The Destruction of the Granary of the Confederacy. Mechanicsburg, Pennsylvania: 1996.
 Manarin, Louis H., editor. Richmond at War: Minutes of the City Council 1861–1865. Chapel Hill, North Carolina: University of North Carolina Press, 1966.
 Marvel, William. A Place Called Appomattox. Chapel Hill, North Carolina: University of North Carolina Press, 2000.
 Meserve, Stevan F. The Civil War in Loundoun County, Virginia. Charleston, South Carolina: The History Press, 2008.
 Morris, George S. and Susan L. Foutz. Lynchburg in the Civil War: The City – The People – The Battle. Lynchburg, Virginia: H. E. Howard, Inc., 1984.
 Muir, Dorothy. Mount Vernon: The Civil War Years. Mount Vernon, Virginia: Mount Vernon Ladies' Association, 1993.
 Musselman, Homer D. Stafford County in the Civil War. Lynchburg, Virginia: H.E. Howard, 1995.
 Noyalas, Jonathan A. Civil War Legacy in the Shenandoah: Remembrance, Reunion & Reconciliation. Charleston, South Carolina: The History Press, 2015. ISBN 9781626198883.
 Noyalas, Jonathan A. Plagued by War: Winchester, Virginia, During the Civil War. Leesburg, Virginia: Gauley Mount Press, 2003.
 Philips, Edward H. The Lower Shenandoah Valley in the Civil War: The Impact of War Upon the Civilian Population and Upon Civil Institutions. Lynchburg, Virginia: H.E. Howard, 1993.
 Pond, George E. The Shenandoah in the Civil War. New York: Carles Scribner's Sons, 1883.
 Putnam, Sallie A. Richmond During the War. New York: G. W. Carleton, 1867.
 Quarles, Garland R. Occupied Winchester 1861–1865. Winchester, Virginia: Winchester–Frederick County Historical Society, 1991.
 Quarstein, John V. Hampton and Newport News in the Civil War: War Comes to the Peninsula. Lynchburg, Virginia: H.E. Howard, 1998.
 Quarstein, John V. The Civil War on the Virginia Peninsula. Arcadia Publishing, 1997.
 Riggs, David F. Embattled Shrine: Jamestown in the Civil War. Shippensburg, Pennsylvania: White Mane, 1997.
 Robertson, Jr., James I. Civil War Virginia: Battleground for a Nation. Charlottesville, Virginia: University Press of Virginia, 1991. .
 Sharpe, Hal F. Shenandoah County in the Civil War: Four Dark Years. Charleston, South Carolina: The History Press, 2012. ISBN 9781596297609.
 Thomas, Emory. The Confederate State of Richmond: A Biography of the Capital. Austin, Texas: University of Texas Press, 1971.
 Wallenstein, Peter and Bertram Wyatt-Brown, editors. Virginia's Civil War. Charlottesville, Virginia: University of Virginia Press, 2005.
 Williams, Jr., Richard G. Lexington, Virginia and the Civil War. Charleston, South Carolina: The History Press, 2013. ISBN 9781609493912.
 Wilson, Greene A. Civil War Petersburg: Confederate City in the Crucible of War. Charlottesville, Virginia: University Press of Virginia, 2006.
 Woodward, Harold R. For Home and Honor: The Story of Madison County, Virginia, During the War Between the States, 1861–1865. H.R. Woodward, 1990.

West Virginia
 Cohen, Stan. The Civil War in West Virginia: A Pictorial History. Charleston, West Virginia: Pictorial Histories Publishing Company, 1995.
 Cook, Roy. Lewis County in the Civil War, 1861–1865. Charleston, West Virginia: Jerret Printing, 1924.
 Curry, Richard O. "A Reappraisal of Statehood Politics in West Virginia".  The Journal of Southern History Vol. 28, No. 4. (November, 1962) pp. 403–421. in JSTOR
 Dickenson, Jack L. Wayne County, West Virginia in the Civil War. Huntington, West Virginia: published by the author, 2003.
 Graham, Michael B. The Coal River Valley in the Civil War: West Virginia Mountains, 1861. Charleston, South Carolina: The History Press, 2014. .
 Matheny, Herman E. Wood County, West Virginia, in Civil War Times. Parkersburg, West Virginia: Trans–Allegheny Books, 1987.
 Snell, Mark A. West Virginia and the Civil War: Mountaineers Are Always Free. Charleston, South Carolina: The History Press, 2011. .

Wisconsin
 Klement, Frank L. Wisconsin and the Civil War. Madison, Wisconsin: State Historical Society of Wisconsin, 1963.
 Love, William DeLoss. Wisconsin in the War of the Rebellion. Chicago, Illinois: Church and Goodman, 1866.
 Trask, Kerry A. Fire Within: A Civil War Narrative from Wisconsin. Kent, Ohio: Kent State University Press, 1995.

See also

Notes

 

 
American Civil War